Harmsia is a genus of flowering plants belonging to the family Malvaceae.

It is native to Ethiopia, Kenya and Somalia.

The genus name of Harmsia is in honour of Hermann Harms (1870–1942), a German taxonomist and botanist. It was first described and published in H.G.A.Engler & K.A.E.Prantl, Nat. Pflanzenfam., Nachtr. Vo.1 on page 240 in 1897.

Known species, according to Kew:
Harmsia lepidota 
Harmsia sidoides

References

Dombeyoideae
Malvaceae genera
Afrotropical realm flora
Plants described in 1897
Flora of Somalia
Flora of Ethiopia
Flora of Kenya